Seyed Ali "Amir" Eftekhari  is an Iranian football midfielder who played for Iran in the 1988 Asian Cup.

"Amir" scored a magistral goal against China during the 1990 World Cup qualifiers, last game of First round - Group 5 on July 24, 1989. Before this decisive match, R.P. China lead the pool with 10 points and a large goals difference: 11/0 ! Playing at home, Iran (8 points and 9/3 goals) must win with at least three goals wide. "Team Melli" escaped at "3-0" on 53rd minute, but Chinese team came back to "3-2" and clinch the group win on goals difference (11/3 against 12/5).

Honours
 AFC Asian Cup (third place): 1988

References

 

1964 births
Living people
Iranian footballers
Sepidrood Rasht players
Esteghlal F.C. players
Keshavarz players
Saipa F.C. players
Persepolis F.C. players
Balestier Khalsa FC players
Homa F.C. players
Azadegan League players
Singapore Premier League players
Association football midfielders
Iranian expatriate footballers
Iranian expatriate sportspeople in Singapore
Expatriate footballers in Singapore
Iran international footballers
People from Rasht
Sportspeople from Gilan province